Ipoh Parade is a shopping complex in Ipoh, Perak, Malaysia with anchor tenants such as Parkson, Golden Screen Cinemas, Jaya Grocer, Guardian and Mr DIY. It was built and operated by the Lion Group in 1994. The mall was sold to ARA Asia Dragon Fund in 2012 and was closed in late 2013 to 2014 for a major refurbishment. It is now owned by ARA Harmony III and managed by ARA Asset Management Limited (ARA).
As of March 2019, the mall's net lettable area (NLA) of 624,694 sq. ft. and it is reported to be 98.2%  tenanted.

Background
Ipoh Parade was the first modern mall in the historic town of Ipoh. The mall underwent a major refurbishment in 2013 and was reopened in 2014. The mall has karaoke booths, bowling alleys, laser tag centres, and GSC cineplex (the largest in Perak) that includes a GSC BIG theatre. It also includes a childcare facility for mothers and a prayer hall for Muslims.

The mall has played host to large community-based events such as the annual Shuddup N’ Dance, Cosplay, Diabolo Masters Championship and Lion Dance competitions attended by local and regional participants.

Award won
 Malaysia Book of Record as the "Biggest Outdoor LED Advertising Screen".

Access

Buses
Ipoh Parade is accessible via the Route 116 (Terminal Amanjaya) bus service.

References

External links
Ipoh Parade

Buildings and structures in Ipoh
Shopping malls in Malaysia
Shopping malls established in 1994